The Harrington Archaeological Site, also known as the Alabama Archaeological Survey 1 Mt 231, is the site of a Native American settlement along Catoma Creek in modern Montgomery County, Alabama.  The site contains numerous artifacts from the Calloway Phase of the Woodland period, including potsherds, bone tools, and plant and animal remains.

Material from two middens on the site were radiocarbon dated to around 175 CE and around 550 CE.

References

Archaeological sites on the National Register of Historic Places in Alabama
Native American history of Alabama
Archaeological sites in Alabama
National Register of Historic Places in Montgomery County, Alabama
Former populated places in Alabama
Populated places on the National Register of Historic Places in Alabama